The Indiana State Museum is a museum located in downtown Indianapolis, Indiana, United States. The museum houses exhibits on the science, art, culture, and history of Indiana from prehistoric times to the present day.

History
The original collection of the Indiana State Museum was started in 1862, during the Civil War, when State Librarian R. Deloss Brown began collecting minerals and other curiosities that he kept in a cabinet. In 1869, the Indiana General Assembly enacted a law that provided “for the collection and preservation of a Geological and Mineralogical Cabinet of the Natural History of this State.” A state geologist was assigned the task of labeling and organizing the collection, becoming the first employee of what would eventually become the Indiana State Museum.

The natural history collection quickly developed beyond the legislature's original intent when hundreds of cultural items, many relating to the recent Civil War, were added. Soon the collection was a museum of sorts, with a hodge-podge of curios and specimens.

Indiana Statehouse
The museum's collection was displayed in a spacious room on the third floor of the State Capitol building in 1888, but it did not remain there for long. It was frequently moved from room to room until 1919 when the collection was sent to a most inhospitable place, the basement of the Statehouse. It would languish in this location for almost 45 years, completely closing once in the late 1920s and again in the early 1960s.

During the administration of Governor Ralph F. Gates (1945-1949), steps were taken to establish a new and modern state museum. Staff members who knew how to care for artifacts and operate a museum were hired. Possible sites for a new facility were studied and designs were created. "Philanthropist Eli Lilly, excited by the prospect of a professional-quality museum of Indiana heritage, donated the ground on the northwest corner of Ohio and Senate streets to the state. Unfortunately, the plans fell through, probably due to the $3.5 million price tag".

Later, the administration of Governor Harold W. Handley (1957-1961) and the legislature authorized a commission to examine the state museum. The commission recommended the construction of a building on the site originally proposed by the Gates administration. The commission reported that its members had “been forced to the reluctant conclusion that Indiana has the poorest and most inadequate state museum in the United States.”

Old City Hall Building
In 1962 Governor Matthew E. Welsh (1961-1965) approved the resumption of the planning for a new state museum, but with a very different direction. The Indianapolis City Hall at 202 N. Alabama St. had become available in 1961 due to city government offices moving to the new City-County Building. The state and the city worked out an agreement for the museum to use the old building. The structure underwent extensive renovations to prepare it for life as a museum, at a cost of about $830,000. In 1967, the Indiana State Museum opened its doors in its first real home. It had four floors and a basement in which to develop exhibits, store and preserve collections, and provide office space for staff.

In 1969, the Indiana State Museum Society (now the Indiana State Museum Foundation) was established to provide a private, fund-raising support organization. Also in 1969, the Indiana State Museum Volunteer Organization was established to assist the small museum staff. By 1976, the museum had received accreditation from the American Association of Museums, now known as the American Alliance of Museums.

As years passed and the collection grew, the old City Hall became too small to meet the needs of the institution. Proposals were made in the late-1970s and mid-1980s for a variety of additions to the facility. Some involved purchasing nearby buildings and others involved creating brand-new facilities that would connect to the old City Hall building.

Move to White River State Park
The museum's board voted to move to White River State Park in 1984. However, it was not until the late 1990s that the Indiana General Assembly appropriated funds that led to the August 1999 groundbreaking of the current Indiana State Museum.

The Indiana State Museum closed its doors in the old City Hall on Dec. 31, 2001, in order to move to its new home at 650 W. Washington Street, opening there on May 22, 2002. The new building on the Indiana Central Canal in White River State Park cost about $105 million.

Galleries

Gov. Frank O'Bannon Great Hall

 Dean and Barbara White Auditorium
 Legacy Theater: The Indiana African American Experience

First floor

 Birth of the Earth
 Ancient Seas
 R.B. Annis Naturalist's Lab
 Frozen Reign
 First Nations
 Natural Regions

Second floor

 Contested Territory
 19th State
 The Hoosier Way
 Crossroads of America
 Enterprise Indiana
 Global Indiana
 American Originals
 Firefly Landing

Third floor
 Rapp Reception Hall
 The Ford Gallery  
 NiSource Gallery
 South Gallery
 Lincoln Financial Foundation Gallery

92 County Walk
The 92 County Walk is an art experience incorporated into the building's façade that spotlights Indiana's 92 counties by featuring an original sculpture for each county. The sculptures are made of limestone, aluminum, glass, and other materials and represent the uniqueness of each Indiana county.

Collections
The museum's collection consists of items relating to Indiana's history, arts, and natural sciences. The collection of more than 500,000 objects contains six focus areas, which the museum refers to as "Centers of Excellence." These areas are Ice Age paleontology, Abraham Lincoln, Indiana art and artists, quilts and textiles, Indiana industry, technology, and agriculture, and Indiana archaeology.

State Historic Sites
The museum is part of the Indiana State Museum and Historic Sites. This statewide institution maintains the museum and 11 state historic sites. Each site interprets the history of an important person, place, or event in Indiana's history.

Indiana State Historic Sites

See also

List of U.S. state historical societies and museums
List of attractions and events in Indianapolis
List of IMAX venues
Indiana Register of Historic Sites and Structures

References

External links

  Official website
  Indiana State Historic Sites

Museums in Indianapolis
Art museums and galleries in Indiana
History museums in Indiana
Natural history museums in Indiana
White River State Park
Paleontology in Indiana
Institutions accredited by the American Alliance of Museums